Chicha Libre is a Brooklyn-based six-member band founded by Olivier Conan. Its name is a reference to chicha,  a corn-based liquor that has been produced in South America since the time of the Incas. It is also the name of a Peruvian musical genre (also known as Peruvian cumbia) on which the band's music is based.

History
Conan was first introduced to chicha music on a trip to Peru in 2005. Their first album, ¡Sonido Amazonico!, was released in 2008 on Barbes Records, a label which Conan runs from his home in Brooklyn. They released their second album, Canibalismo, in 2012, and an EP, Cuatro Tigres, in 2013, both digitally and on vinyl.

The band's original members were Olivier Conan (lead vocalist, cuatro), Josh Camp (DuoVox, keyboards, background vocals), Vincent Douglas (guitar), Greg Burrows (percussion, background vocals, timbales, bongos, guiro, reco-reco), Timothy Quigley (percussion, bongo, shakers, conga) and Nick Cudahy (bass guitar). Additional members are Neil Ochoa (congas) and Karina Colis (timbales). Featured guest artists have included Jose Carballo (a former member of the seminal Peruvian chicha band, Los Hijos del Sol).

Style
The band's music is based on chicha, a fusion of rock and roll and cumbia produced by the native population of the Peruvian Andes and Amazon. This music was most popular in the 1960s and 1970s in northern Peru. Conan has described his band's music as "free-form Chicha" and has said they take many liberties with chicha music.

Reception
Sonido Amazonico received a favorable review from Brendon Griffin in PopMatters. Griffin wrote that "...like the best music of any genre it leaves you wondering about the mystery of it all" and gave the album a rating of 9 out of 10. Jon Lusk wrote on the BBC's website that the album's music was "too self-conscious and contrived to match the fevered originals". Robert Christgau awarded Cuatro Tigres an A- and wrote that the band "acknowledge[s] their true roots" on the EP.

Discography

Studio albums

Sonido Amazonico! (2008)
 Sonido Amazonico
 Primavera en la Selva
 Mi Plato de Barro
 Tres Pasajeros
 The Hungry song
 El Borrachito
 Pavane
 Six Pieds Sous Terre
 Un Shipibo en España
 Indian Summer
 La Cumbia del Zapatero
 Popcorn Andino
 Yo No Fui
 Gnosienne No. 1

Canibalismo (2012)
 La Plata (En Mi Carrito De Lata)
 Danza Del Millonario
 El Carnicero De Chicago
 Muchachita Del Oriente
 Depresion Tropical
 Juaneco En El Cielo
 Intermission
 L'Age d'Or
 Papageno Eléctrico
 Number 17
 Lupita En La Selva Y El Doctor
 The Ride Of The Valkyries (Composed By – Richard Wagner)
 La Danza De Don Lucho
 Once Tejones

 Engineers: Jason LaFarge, Joshua Camp, Olivier Conan
 Mastered by: Scott Hull (2)
 Mixed by: Bryce Goggin
 Producers: Joshua Camp, Olivier Conan

EP

Cuatro tigres
 The Guns of Brixton (Strummer, Jones, Headon, Simonon)
 Rica Chicha (Jaime Moreyra)
 Alone Again Or (Brian Maclean)
 La Danza de los Simpsons (Danny Elfman)

 Producer: Olivier Conan and Joshua Camp
 Mixed by: Bryce Goggin at Trout Recording
 Cover: Elliot Tupac

References

External links

Musical groups from Brooklyn
Cumbia musical groups